Nice, Nice, Very Nice is the second album by Canadian singer-songwriter Dan Mangan, released on August 11, 2009. The album was a shortlisted nominee for the 2010 Polaris Music Prize.

The album's title is a quotation from a poem contained in American author Kurt Vonnegut's 1963 novel Cat's Cradle.

Two tracks on the album were released as singles and had music videos produced: "Robots", directed by Mike Lewis, and "Sold", directed by Sean Devlin.

A tenth-anniversary deluxe edition of the album was released in 2019, featuring demo versions of many of the album's songs.

Track listing

References

2009 albums
Dan Mangan albums
Arts & Crafts Productions albums